Jeremy Ray Valdez (born July 10, 1980) is an American actor and musician. He won the 2010 Imagen Award for Best Supporting Actor in a Feature Film for his role in La Mission.

Early life
Valdez was born in Santa Fe, New Mexico in 1980. His father is of Mexican heritage and his mother is of Navajo descent.

Career 
Valdez began his career in national commercials for Coca-Cola, McDonald's, Six Flags, Verizon Communications, and Toys "R" Us. Valdez landed his first television role on The Brothers Garcia.

Valdez has appeared in recurring roles on television shows including ER, Veronica Mars, Drake & Josh and guest starring roles on The Closer, NCIS, 24, CSI: NY, JAG, The Shield, CSI: Miami, Without a Trace, That's So Raven, Medical Investigation, Boston Public and One on One. He also starred in the HBO TV Movie, Walkout, directed by Edward James Olmos. Valdez portrays Robert Avila, an undercover police officer who poses as a high school student, in the film based on the true story of the five Mexican-American East LA high schools that organized a walkout in 1968 to protest poor school conditions. Additionally, Jeremy starred in Junkyard Saints, a film which was featured on the PBS series Independent Lens. He also played the role of Adan in the film, Blaze You Out, directed by Mateo Frazier and Diego Joaquin Lopez in 2013.

Valdez starred in the 2010 independent hit La Mission. Jeremy has garnered accolades and success from his role as Jesse Rivera in the film. These include a 2010 IMAGEN Award for "Best Supporting Actor". La Mission stars Valdez, alongside Benjamin Bratt, and was featured at the 2009 Sundance Film Festival. Jeremy also starred opposite Charles S. Dutton in the upcoming film, "The Obama Effect". In 2010 he was cast in Allan Ball's newest pilot for HBO, "All Signs of Death". In the spring of 2010, Valdez starred in the feature film Benavides Born, filmed in South Texas. Benavides Born was selected to premiere at the 2011 Sundance Film Festival, in competition. This will mark the second film in two years that Jeremy has starred in a film that will be included in the Sundance Film Festival.

In March 2018 Valdez joined the cast of The Bold and the Beautiful as Detective Alex Sanchez.

Personal life 
Valdez resides in Arizona.

Filmography

Film

Television

References

External links

1980 births
Living people
Male actors from New Mexico
American male actors of Mexican descent
American people of Navajo descent
American male film actors
American male television actors
Actors from Santa Fe, New Mexico
21st-century American male actors